Moses Ebe Ochonu  is a Nigerian academic, historian, author and professor of African History at Vanderbilt University, Nashville, Tennessee. He has been the Cornelius Vanderbilt Chair in History since 2017.

Early life
Ochonu was born in Benue State, and he attended Bayero University Kano graduating with B.A History in 1997. He received his Ph.D from the University of Michigan, Ann Arbor, Michigan.
He was twice a fellow of the American Council of Learned Societies ACLS. His research has also received support from the Harry Frank Guggenheim Foundation, the British Library, the National Endowment for the Humanities (NEH), the Ford Foundation and the American Historical Association.

Published work

Books
Colonial Meltdown: Northern Nigerian in the Great Depression, (Ohio University Press, 2009) 
Colonialism by Proxy: Hausa Imperial Agents and Middle Belt Consciousness in Nigeria, (Indiana University Press, 2014)
Africa in Fragments: Essays on Nigeria, Africa, and Global Africanity, (New York Diasporic Africa Press, 2014)
Emirs in London: Subaltern Travel and Nigeria's Modernity, (Indiana University Press, 2022)

Book reviews
Wale Adebanwi, Yoruba Elites and Ethnic Politics in Nigeria: Obafemi Awolowo and Corporate Agency (Cambridge University Press, 2014)
Andrew Barnes, Making Headway: The Introduction of Western Civilization in Colonial Northern Nigeria, (University of Rochester Press, 2009)
Toyin Falola and Ann Genova, Historical Dictionary of Nigeria, by Toyin Falola and Ann Genova (Scarecrow Press, 2009)
Alvin O. Thompson,Economic Parasitism: European Rule in West Africa 1880-1960, (The University of the West Indies, 2006)

References

Further reading

Living people
Nigerian academics
Bayero University Kano alumni
University of Michigan alumni
Vanderbilt University faculty
Year of birth missing (living people)